The Bayer designations b Carinae and B Carinae are distinct and the designation b Carinae is shared by two stars in the constellation Carina:
for b1 Carinae, see V376 Carinae
for b2 Carinae, see HD 77370
for B Carinae, see HR 3220

See also
β Carinae

Carinae, b
Carina (constellation)